Chimanrao Patil is a politician from Jalgaon district, Maharashtra. He is current Member of Maharashtra Legislative Assembly from  Erandol Vidhan Sabha constituency  as a member of Shiv Sena.

Positions held
 2009: Elected to Maharashtra Legislative Assembly
 2019: Elected to Maharashtra Legislative Assembly

References

External links
  Shivsena Home Page 

Shiv Sena politicians
Year of birth missing (living people)
Living people